Iron Pot is a small flat sandstone island with an area of 1.27 ha in south-eastern Australia.  It is part of the Betsey Island Group, lying close to the south-eastern coast of Tasmania around the entrance to the River Derwent.  It is the site of the Iron Pot Lighthouse, Tasmania's first lighthouse.

Flora and fauna
The vegetation is dominated by boxthorn and lupins. Recorded breeding seabird and wader species are little penguin, Pacific gull, silver gull, pied oystercatcher and black-faced cormorant.

Access
The island is frequented by tourism operator Pennicott Wilderness Journeys, departing from Constitution Dock at Sullivan's Cove. The historic derrick crane once used for offloading supplies to the island today functions as a visual marker for incoming boats. The island can be approached from South Arm.

References

Islands of Tasmania